Jean-Jacques Schuhl (born October 9, 1941 in Marseille) is a French author, recipient of the 2000 Prix Goncourt literary award for his novel Ingrid Caven. The book is named for the German actress and singer Ingrid Caven, whom Schuhl lives with. Despite appearances, the novel is not her biography.

Works 

 Rose Poussière (1972)
 Télex N° 1 (1972)
 Ingrid Caven (2000)
 Entrée des fantômes, Paris, Gallimard, coll. « L'Infini » (2010)
Obsessions (nouvelles), Paris, Gallimard, coll. « L'Infini » (2014)

References

External links 
 Excerpt from Ingrid Caven
 Forgotten author hits big time with his lover's story Article on Schuhl winning the Prix Goncourt by Stuart Jeffries in The Guardian
 Article in French

1941 births
Living people
Writers from Marseille
20th-century French novelists
21st-century French novelists
20th-century French Jews
Prix Goncourt winners
French male novelists
20th-century French male writers
21st-century French male writers